Deb Lavender (born October 11, 1956) is an American politician who from 2015 to 2021 served in the Missouri House of Representatives, and is serving again as of 2023. A Democrat, Lavender represented the 90th district from 2015 to 2021, which comprised all or part of the cities of Glendale, Kirkwood, Oakland, Sunset Hills, Warson Woods, and Webster Groves in St. Louis County. In 2020, she unsuccessfully ran for the Missouri Senate against incumbent Republican Andrew Koenig. As of 2022, she was elected to the House again from District 98, which includes the cities of Manchester, Twin Oaks, and Valley Park.

Early life and education 
Lavender was born and raised in Ridgefield, Connecticut. Her interest in government service developed while, as a teenager, she participated in Girls State, a leadership program sponsored by the American Legion Auxiliary. Through her experience with the Girls State organization, she learned to appreciate the importance and value of democratic government. In 1979, Lavender was graduated from Marquette University in Milwaukee with a Bachelor of Science in physical therapy. She worked throughout her time in school to pay her tuition and living expenses. Soon after graduation Lavender moved to St. Louis, where she has been a resident for over 35 years.

Political career 
Lavender's political career began in 2006 as an intern for Missouri State Representative Barbara Fraser. Lavender ran for office the first time in 2008 as the unsuccessful Democratic candidate vying for the Missouri State Representative District-90 seat against Republican incumbent Rick Stream. In the next two general elections, 2010 and 2012 Lavender also lost to Stream.

On her fourth try, she was elected to the District-90 State House of Representatives seat in 2014. She was unopposed in her party's 2014 primary election and went on to defeat Republican Gina Jaksetic in the general election. Lavender was elected for a second term in 2016, winning against Republican Mark Milton. She was unopposed in that 2016 Democratic primary. In 2018, Lavender was again unopposed in her party's primary, and ran unopposed in the general election to continue for a third term as the State Representative in District-90.

After her unsuccessful run for Missouri Senate District 15, she moved to a new home a few miles west in the city of Manchester, and then ran for the House for a fourth time, winning in 2022. Because of term limits, this will be her last term in the House.

Political views and accomplishments

Gun control 
Lavender is against the proliferation of guns in public spaces. In the interest of public safety, she supports effecting new gun legislation and modification of existing gun laws. For example, she proposed red flag House Bill 40, which modifies restraining orders by adding provisions that allow the confiscation of firearms from individuals a court deems to be a danger to themselves or others. Lavender voted against House Bill 575 which authorizes carrying concealed weapons on college campuses and allows campus security officers to carry weapons. She also voted against Senate Bill 656 which proposed to expand open carry allowances, restricted requirements for concealed carry permits, and expanded the Castle Doctrine.

Health care 
Lavender supports increased accessibility to, and the affordability of, health care. She has supported budget priorities funding healthcare for disabled and older adults. For example, she proposed House Bills 38 and 39 to expand Medicaid services.

Public schools 
Lavender supports fully funding the State public school foundation formula. She believes public schools' transportation needs should be adequately funded before the Legislature effects further tax cuts. Lavender is opposed to shortening the school year. She voted against House Bill 161 which prevents the school year from starting in the Fall prior to 14 days before the first Monday in September.

Reproductive issues 
Lavender is a proponent of reproductive rights. Her legislative record is aligned with reproductive rights political views. For example, she voted against House Bill 126 that would criminalize abortion services if Roe v. Wade is overturned. She also opposed House Bill 1266 that prohibits abortion after 22 weeks of pregnancy. Further, Lavender sponsored House Bill 2266 requiring organizations that provide pregnancy-related services to provide medically accurate information regarding reproductive health options in order to receive state funding. Also she cast a vote in favor of House Bill 487 authorizing a pharmacist to dispense self-administered oral contraceptives to a person who is 18-years or older.

Committees 
At the start of the Missouri 100th General Assembly (January 2019-January 2021), Lavender served on the following committees:

 Agriculture Policy
 Budget
 Conference Committee on Budget
 Rules - Legislative Oversight, Ranking Minority Member
 Subcommittee on Appropriations - Health, Mental Health, and Social Services, Ranking Minority Member
 Joint Committee on Legislative Research
 Joint Committee on Legislative Research - Oversight Subcommittee

Electoral history

State Representative

State Senate

References

1956 births
Living people
Women state legislators in Missouri
Democratic Party members of the Missouri House of Representatives
21st-century American politicians
21st-century American women politicians